Yuli may refer to:

People
Yuli Berkovich a scientist who did experiments with seed germination in zero gravity in the International Space Station
Yuli Burkin, a Russian writer (sci-fi) and musician
Yuli Daniel, a Soviet dissident writer, poet, translator, political prisoner and gulag survivor
Yuli Dunsky, a Soviet scriptwriter
Yuli Gurriel, a Cuban professional baseball infielder
Yuli Gusman, a Soviet, Russian and Azerbaijani film director and actor
Yuli Raizman, a Soviet Russian film director and screenwriter
Yuli Tamir, an Israeli academic, politician and former Minister of Immigrant Absorption
Yuli Mikhailovich Vorontsov a Russian diplomat and President of International Centre of the Roerichs 
Yuli-Yoel Edelstein, a Russian-Israeli politician and former Minister of Immigrant Absorption
Zheng Yuli, a retired female badminton player from China
Nickname of the Cuban-British ballet dancer and director Carlos Acosta

Places
Yuli County (尉犁县), of Bayingolin Mongol Autonomous Prefecture, Xinjiang, China
Yuli (尉犁), the former name of Korla in Bayingolin Mongol Autonomous Prefecture, Xinjiang, China
 (育黎镇), town in Rushan City, Shandong, China
 (于里镇), town in Wulian County, Shandong, China
Yuli, Hualien (玉里鎮), township in Hualien County, Taiwan

Other
Chongqing−Lichuan Railway, also known as Yuli Railway, in Chongqing and Hubei, PR China
Yuli (race), a fictional race from the sci-fi Star Control computer game series
Yuli: The Carlos Acosta Story, 2018 biopic of the Cuban dancer